Edward Oliver James "Ed" Petrie (born 22 August 1978) is an English actor, comedian, and television presenter.

Early life
Petrie was born and raised in Rustington, West Sussex. He was educated at Broadwater Manor in Worthing, West Sussex, and the independent school Ardingly College in Ardingly, West Sussex.

Career
Previous presenting work includes hosting various children's programmes, on Nickelodeon, from January 2005 until September 2007, including Slime Across the UK and The Crunch.

In 2002, Ed Petrie was a researcher for the BBC programme, They Think It's All Over and, in 2005, was a comedy sketch writer for BBC Radio 1's The Milk Run.

He was a finalist in both, So You Think You're Funny? and York's comedy festival, National Talent Hunt in 2003. The following year, Ed was a semi-finalist in the BBC's New Comedy Awards.

Acting work has included appearances in the Channel 4 comedy programmes Green Wing and Smack the Pony.

In 2012 he performed as one of the warm up acts on Greg Davies's Back of My Mum's Head tour.

Before joining CBBC's presentation department in September 2007, Petrie hosted the game show Wonderful World of Weird.

He later became the chief continuity presenter for the CBBC Channel, presenting afternoon links for the CBBC Channel alongside Oucho T. Cactus. The duo later presented Ed and Oucho's Excellent Inventions and a weekend morning show entitled Transmission Impossible with Ed & Oucho.

In 2008, he was nominated for a BAFTA in the Best Children's Presenter category, and collected the BAFTA for Best Children's Channel when it was won by CBBC.

Ed and Oucho's Excellent Inventions Series 2 aired on the CBBC channel on BBC 2 on 2 January 2010.

Ed presented weekend links on the CBBC Channel with new CBBC presenter Chris Johnson as of January 2010 whilst Oucho (Warrick Brownlow-Pike) was replaced by Dodge T Dog (Warrick Brownlow-Pike).

Ed left CBBC presentation in June 2010, to present All Over the Place, a show on CBBC with Holly Walsh which started airing in February 2011. As part of promotion for the series, Petrie returned to CBBC Continuity for one day. A second series of All Over the Place aired between January and March 2012.

In summer 2012 he presented a new CBBC series with Naomi Wilkinson, Marrying Mum and Dad, where children plan their parents' weddings.

In November 2012 he starred in 12 Again with Dionne Bromfield, Adam Lambert and John Humphrys.

Personal life
Petrie has said through Twitter that his girlfriend is French, and that she also appeared in a Comic Relief special starring Kate Moss. They have two children.

He supports Crystal Palace FC.

He confirmed on his Instagram Livestream on 22 April 2020 that he is married and has a wife.

Filmography

Television

External links
 Ed Petrie's own website
 
 Ed Petrie's Twitter page
 CBBC stars
 Ed Petrie on Chortle

1978 births
Living people
English television presenters
People educated at Ardingly College
National Youth Theatre members
People from Rustington